Samoa first competed at the Summer Paralympic Games in 2000, sending a single athlete to compete in track and field. The country has participated in every Summer Paralympics since then, but has never taken part in the Winter Paralympic Games, and has never won a Paralympic medal. Samoans have only ever competed in track and field events.

Full results for Samoa at the Paralympics

See also

 Samoa at the Olympics

References